Chekhovskie Medvedi is a handball club from Chekhov, Moscow Oblast, Russia. They compete in the Russian Handball Super League and in the SEHA League. After the launching of the 2022 Russian invasion of Ukraine, the European Handball Federation in February 2022 temporarily suspended the team.

The organization was founded in 2001 on the basis of the disbanded original CSKA Moscow Handball Club.

Kits

Accomplishments

As CSKA Moscow
EHF Champions League
Winners (1): 1987–88
EHF Cup Winner's Cup
Winners (1): 1986–87
EHF Cup
Runners-up (1): 1990–91
Soviet Handball Championship
Winners (9) (record): 1973, 1976, 1977, 1978, 1979, 1980, 1982, 1983, 1987
Soviet Handball Cup
Winners (3): 1984, 1985, 1986
Russian Handball Super League
Winners (4): 1994, 1995, 2000, 2001

As Chekhovskiye Medvedi
EHF Cup Winner's Cup
Winners (1): 2005–06 
Russian Handball Super League 
Winners (20) (record): 2002, 2003, 2004, 2005, 2006, 2007, 2008, 2009, 2010, 2011, 2012, 2013, 2014, 2015, 2016, 2017, 2018, 2019, 2020, 2021
Russian Handball Cup
Winners (10) (record): 2006, 2009, 2010, 2011, 2012, 2013, 2015, 2016, 2018, 2019, 2020, 2021
Russian Super Cup
Winners (8) (record): 2014, 2015, 2016, 2017, 2018, 2018, 2019, 2020, 2021

European record

Current squad
Squad for the 2022–23 season

Goalkeepers 
 12  Dmitry Pavlenko
 16  Artyom Grushko
 30  Vladyslav Martynenko
Left Wingers
2  Donat Morozov
 19  Roman Ostrashchenko
Right Wingers
 24  Dmitry Kornev
 39  Ilya Dzemin
Line players 
5  Nikolai Emelianenko
 31  Victor Futsev
 55  Aleksandr Ermakov

Left Backs
3  Dmitrii Santalov
 23  Evgenij Dzemin
Central Backs
 6  Kirill Kotov
 96  Artyom Kulak
Right Backs
 17  Aleksandr Kotov
 98  Nikita Kamenev

Transfers
Transfers for the 2022–23 season

 Joining
  Ilya Dzemin (RW) (from  Dynamo Astrakhan)
  Nikolai Emelianenko (P) (from  Saint Petersburg HC)

 Leaving
  Andrei Klimavets (LB) (to  HC Motor Zaporizhzhia)
  Daniil Shishkaryov (RW) (to  HBC CSKA Moscow)
   Pavel Andreev (P) (to  RK Vardar)

Notable players
  Pavel Sukosyan
  Konstantin Igropulo
 Vitali Ivanov
  Alexey Kostygov
  Alexey Kamanin
  Pavel Atman
   Sergei Gorbok
  Sergei Shelmenko
  Oleg Skopintsev

References

External links

Russian handball clubs
Sport in Moscow Oblast